Mangi is a village in the Karmala taluka of Solapur district in Maharashtra state, India.

Demographics
Covering  and comprising 415 households at the time of the 2011 census of India, Mangi had a population of 1989. There were 1017 males and 972 females, with 298 people being aged six or younger.

See also
Mangi Dam

References

Villages in Karmala taluka